Enith Salón Marcuello (born 24 September 2001) is a Spanish professional footballer who plays as a goalkeeper for Liga F club Valencia CF and the Spain women's national team.

Club career
Salón started her career at Valencia D.

International career
Salón represents Spain. She made her senior debut on 11 November 2022, playing entirely in a 7-0 friendly home win over Argentina.

References

External links
Profile at La Liga

2001 births
Living people
People from Horta Nord
Sportspeople from the Province of Valencia
Footballers from the Valencian Community
Spanish women's footballers
Women's association football goalkeepers
Valencia CF Femenino players
Primera División (women) players
Segunda Federación (women) players
Spain women's international footballers